Charles Alan Correal (born May 17, 1956) is a former American football center. He played for the Atlanta Falcons of the National Football League (NFL) in 1980 and for the Pittsburgh Maulers of the United States Football League (USFL) in 1984.

References

1956 births
Living people
American football centers
Penn State Nittany Lions football players
Philadelphia Eagles players
Atlanta Falcons players
Cleveland Browns players
Pittsburgh Maulers players